The Lycoming IO-233 is a non-certified four-cylinder, air-cooled, horizontally opposed piston aircraft engine that produces between  and .

The IO-233 is a development of the Lycoming O-235, which is itself a derivative of the older Lycoming O-233 engine.

Development

The IO-233 was announced by the company at AirVenture on 28 July 2008 as a new engine for light sport aircraft. The engine was conceived as a lightened version of the Lycoming O-235 by company engineers who were building their own kit LSAs and found that there was no powerplant that met their requirements for power output and weight, with the ability to burn either 100LL avgas or unleaded automotive fuel.

The resulting engine weighs less than the O-235 and incorporates a throttle body injector system with a tuned intake manifold and dual electronic ignition, or optionally a carburetor in place of the throttle body injector to save further cost and weight. The engine has a 2400-hour time between overhauls. Additional features include a lightweight 14 volt alternator, an optimized oil sump, a streamlined accessory housing, a lightweight starter and roller tappets.

When announced in July 2008 Lycoming expected the engine to be available later that year, once ASTM testing for LSA use was completed. The company also contemplated certifying the engine in 2009. There is no indication that certification has been completed.

At AirVenture 2011, the company announced that the engine was commencing volume production and was flying in both fuel-injected and carbureted versions.

Renegade Light Sport's Falcon LS was the first airplane to fly with Lycoming's new IO-233-LSA engine on 6 Oct 2010.

Renegade Light Sport is working with Lycoming to produce an aerobatic version of the IO-233-LSA engine to be designated as the AEIO-233. The design goals include fuel injection, an inverted sump and that it be capable of +9/-3 Gs.

Variants
IO-233-LSA

Applications
Aeris Naviter AN-2 Enara
Dakota Cub Super 18
Denney Kitfox
Foxcon Terrier 200
Renegade Falcon LS
Tecnam P92
World Aircraft Spirit

Specifications (IO-233-LSA)

References

External links

 Textron Lycoming - Manufacturer's home page
 Spec sheet showing images of IO-233

2000s aircraft piston engines
Boxer engines
IO-233